Clypeomorus pellucida, common name the pellucid clitus , is a species of sea snail, a marine gastropod mollusk in the family Cerithiidae.

Description
The size of the shell varies between 20 mm and 30 mm.

Distribution
This marine species occurs in the Western Pacific from the Nicobar Islands to New Caledonia: off Australia (Queensland).

References

 Hombron, J.B. & Jacquinot, H. 1848. Atlas d’Histoire Naturelle Zoologie, Voyage au Pôle Sud et dans l’Oceanie ... Mollusques et Zoophytes. Paris plates 9, 11–25.
 Sowerby II, G.B. 1855. Thesaurus Conchyliorum, or monographs of genera of shells. London : Sowerby Vol. 2(16) 847–899, pls 176–186.
 Frauenfeld, G.R. von 1867. Mollusken. Reise der Österreichischen Fregatte Novara um die Erde in den Jahren 1857, 1858, 1859 2(3): 1–16
 Martin, K. 1884. Palaeontologische Ergebnisse von Tiefbohrungen auf Java, nebst allgemeineren Studien über das Tertiär von Java, Timor and einiger anderer Inseln. Sammlung des Geologischen Reichs-Museums in Leiden, First Series 3(2–3): 43–184, pls1-9
 Dautzenberg, P. & Fischer, H. 1905. Liste des mollusques récoltés par M. le Capitaine de Frégate Blaise au Tonkin et description d'espèces nouvelles. Journal de Conchyliologie 53: 85–234

External links
 

Clypeomorus
Gastropods described in 1852